Following is a list of 1. FC Tatran Prešov seasons.

Slovakia

{|class="wikitable"
|-bgcolor="#efefef"
! Season
!    Division (Name)
! Pos./Teams
! Pl.
! W
! D
! L
! GS
! GA
! P
!Domestic Cup
!colspan=2|Europe
!Notes
|-
|align=center|1993–1994
|align=center|1st (Mars Superliga)
|align=center|4/(12)
|align=center|32
|align=center|10
|align=center|14
|align=center|8
|align=center|47
|align=center|43
|align=center|34
|align=center bgcolor=silver|Runner-up
|align=center|
|align=center|
|align=center|
|-
|align=center|1994–1995
|align=center|1st (Mars Superliga)
|align=center|9/(12)
|align=center|32
|align=center|9
|align=center|10
|align=center|13
|align=center|42
|align=center|49
|align=center|37
|align=center|
|align=center|UC
|align=center|1/16 finals (second round)
|align=center|
|-
|-
|align=center|1995–1996
|align=center|1st (Mars Superliga)
|align=center|5/(12)
|align=center|32
|align=center|12
|align=center|7
|align=center|13
|align=center|34
|align=center|36
|align=center|43
|align=center|
|align=center|
|align=center|
|align=center|
|-
|align=center|1996–1997
|align=center|1st (Mars Superliga)
|align=center|6/(16)
|align=center|30
|align=center|12
|align=center|7
|align=center|11
|align=center|37
|align=center|38
|align=center|43
|align=center bgcolor=silver|Runner-up
|align=center|
|align=center|
|align=center|
|-
|align=center|1997–1998
|align=center|1st (Mars Superliga)
|align=center|10/(16)
|align=center|30
|align=center|9
|align=center|9
|align=center|12
|align=center|29
|align=center|39
|align=center|36
|align=center|
|align=center|
|align=center|
|align=center|
|-
|align=center|1998–1999
|align=center|1st (Mars Superliga)
|align=center|8/(16)
|align=center|30
|align=center|11
|align=center|10
|align=center|9
|align=center|38
|align=center|35
|align=center|43
|align=center|
|align=center|
|align=center|
|align=center|
|-
|align=center|1999–2000
|align=center|1st (Mars Superliga)
|align=center|6/(16)
|align=center|30
|align=center|14
|align=center|5
|align=center|11
|align=center|38
|align=center|42
|align=center|47
|align=center|
|align=center|
|align=center|
|align=center|
|-
|align=center|2000–2001
|align=center|1st (Mars Superliga)
|align=center|7/(10)
|align=center|36
|align=center|10
|align=center|10
|align=center|16
|align=center|44
|align=center|54
|align=center|40
|align=center|
|align=center|
|align=center|
|align=center|
|-
|align=center|2001–2002
|align=center|1st (Mars Superliga)
|align=center|10/(10)
|align=center|36
|align=center|8
|align=center|7
|align=center|21
|align=center|35
|align=center|66
|align=center|40
|align=center|
|align=center|
|align=center|
|align=center|
|-
|align=center|2002–2003
|align=center|2nd (1. liga)
|align=center|9/(16)
|align=center|30
|align=center|11
|align=center|6
|align=center|13
|align=center|40
|align=center|37
|align=center|39
|align=center|1/4 finals
|align=center|
|align=center|
|align=center|
|-
|align=center|2003–2004
|align=center|2nd (1. liga)
|align=center bgcolor=tan|3/(16)
|align=center|30
|align=center|15
|align=center|7
|align=center|8
|align=center|54
|align=center|35
|align=center|52
|align=center|1/8 finals
|align=center|
|align=center|
|align=center|
|-
|align=center|2004–2005
|align=center|2nd (1. liga)
|align=center|5/(16)
|align=center|30
|align=center|12
|align=center|8
|align=center|10
|align=center|38
|align=center|33
|align=center|44
|align=center|1/32 finals
|align=center|
|align=center|
|align=center|
|-
|align=center|2005–2006
|align=center|2nd (1. liga)
|align=center|5/(16)
|align=center|30
|align=center|15
|align=center|7
|align=center|8
|align=center|37
|align=center|22
|align=center|52
|align=center|1/32 finals
|align=center|
|align=center|
|align=center|
|-
|align=center|2006–2007
|align=center|2nd (1. liga)
|align=center|5/(12)
|align=center|36
|align=center|16
|align=center|14
|align=center|6
|align=center|55
|align=center|25
|align=center|62
|align=center|1/8 finals
|align=center|
|align=center|
|align=center|
|-
|align=center|2007–2008
|align=center|2nd (1. liga)
|align=center bgcolor=gold|1/(12)
|align=center|33
|align=center|23
|align=center|8
|align=center|2
|align=center|64
|align=center|14
|align=center|77
|align=center|1/4 finals
|align=center|
|align=center|
|align=center|
|-
|align=center|2008–2009
|align=center|1st (Corgoň Liga)
|align=center|7/(12)
|align=center|33
|align=center|10
|align=center|11
|align=center|12
|align=center|40
|align=center|50
|align=center|41
|align=center|1/16 finals
|align=center|
|align=center|
|align=center|
|-
|align=center|2009–2010
|align=center|1st (Corgoň Liga)
|align=center|8/(12)
|align=center|33
|align=center|11
|align=center|5
|align=center|17
|align=center|32
|align=center|38
|align=center|38
|align=center|1/8 finals
|align=center|
|align=center|
|align=center|
|-
|align=center|2010–2011
|align=center|1st (Corgoň Liga)
|align=center|11/(12)
|align=center|33
|align=center|9
|align=center|6
|align=center|18
|align=center|30
|align=center|49
|align=center|33
|align=center|1/16 finals
|align=center|
|align=center|
|align=center|
|-
|align=center|2011–2012
|align=center|1st (Corgoň Liga)
|align=center|10/(12)
|align=center|33
|align=center|7
|align=center|12
|align=center|14
|align=center|23
|align=center|35
|align=center|33
|align=center|1/4 finals
|align=center|
|align=center|
|align=center|
|-
|align=center|2012–2013
|align=center|1st (Corgoň Liga)
|align=center bgcolor=red|12/(12)
|align=center|33
|align=center|8
|align=center|9
|align=center|16
|align=center|21
|align=center|41
|align=center|33
|align=center|1/16 finals
|align=center|
|align=center|
|align=center|
|}

References

Seasons
Tatran Prešov